Buli may refer to:

Buli, Halmahera, a town near Maba the capital city of East Halmahera Regency, North Maluku, Indonesia
Buli Airport, the airport in Buli
Buli language (Indonesia)
 Buli Rural District, in Iran
Butyllithium, sometimes abbreviated BuLi, a strong base used in chemical synthesis
Buli (film), a 2004 Malaysian drama black comedy film
 Buli, Muntinlupa, a barangay of the city of Muntinlupa, Philippines

See also
Buli language (disambiguation)